Tongji Medical College (TJMC) is a medical school in Wuhan, China. Formerly Tongji Medical University, it became part of the newly established Huazhong University of Science and Technology (HUST) in 2000. More than 10 graduates of the medical school have been awarded prestigious memberships to the Chinese Academy of Sciences and/or Chinese Academy of Engineering.

The Tongji Medical College is a top medical school in China. It has one member of the Chinese Academy of Sciences and one member of the Chinese Academy of Engineering, and one member of the US National Academy of Medicine (Frank B. Hu), more than 1,400 full and associate professors, over 1,800 lecturers, and over 7,500 staff. Doctorate degrees can be conferred in 31 subjects and specialties, with 116 tutors for doctoral candidates, and there are 51 subjects and specialties for which master's degrees can be granted with over 540 tutors for graduate students. Post-doctoral mobile stations have been set up in basic medicine, public health,  preventive medicine and clinical medicine.

Historical evolution

Summary of history
Tongji Medical College was founded by Dr. Erich Paulun in 1907 as German Medical School in Shanghai. In 1927, it became the medical school of National Tongji University.

After the founding of the People's Republic of China, in 1951 the medical school was moved from Shanghai to Wuhan, where it merged with the medical college of Wuhan University to form Central-South Tongji Medical College. Tongji Hospital, founded in Shanghai in 1900 by Erich Paulun, a German physician, and Wuhan Union Hospital (formerly Hankow Mission and Hankou Union Hospital) founded in 1866 by Griffith John, a British man, were attached to Tongji College as its university hospitals. In 1955, the name of the college was changed to Wuhan Medical College; and in 1985, it was renamed Tongji Medical University. On May 26, 2000, it became the Tongji Medical College of Huazhong University of Science and Technology.

Shanghai German Medical school
October 1, 1907, the medical school held an opening ceremony. The school site was set up in the Tongji University hospital opposite White Gram Road (now Shanghai Fengyang Road).

Tongji German Medicine School
In 1908 "Shanghai German Medical School" changed its name to "Tongji German Medical School".

Tongji Medical and Engineering School
In 1912, additional engineering courses were started, and the name was changed to Tongji Medical and Engineering School. Medicine, Engineering and the German were taught in the school.
In 1922, the school moved to Wusong Town

National Tongji University Medical School
On May 20, 1924, the name was changed to Tongji Medical and Engineering University, due to comprehensive expansion of the school.
In August 1927, National Tongji University was established, and the original medicine, engineering branches were separately changed to medicine school and engineering school.
In 1937, several additional colleges and schools were built, including colleges of Literature and sciences, and a law school. The University became a comprehensive university, and was renowned for its prestigious reputation in medicine and engineering.
In August 1937, Wusong Town and Shanghai city were engaged in a decisive battle of Far East field during World War II. Shortly after the battle, the medical school moved to East side of Shanghai city, then across provinces of Zhejiang, Jiangxi, Guangxi and Yunnan, and finally arrived in Yibin() and Nanxi of Sichuan province in October, 1940.
In July 1946, Tongji University Medical School moved back Shanghai with ending of the World War II.

Central-south Tongji Medical College

In February 1950, the Shanghai Tongji University Medical School and its attached Tongji Hospital moved to the hinterland of Wuhan. The Medical School, along with Wuhan University medical School, formed the newly established Central-south Tongji Medical College.

Wuhan Medical College
In August 1955, the Medical School changed name to Wuhan Medical College during rearrangement of Chinese Higher Education system.

Tongji Medical University 
In July 1985, the Medical School changed name to Tongji Medical University after significant expansion of the school. Dr. Wu Zaide was appointed president, and Dr. Qiu Fazu 裘法祖 as honorary president.

Tongji Medical College of HUST
On June 15, 2000, the university became part of the new Huazhong University of Science and Technology. The name was changed to Tongji Medical College of Huazhong University of Science and Technology.

The discipline and state key laboratory

State key disciplines
Internal medicine (Cardiology)
Internal medicine (Pulmonary/Critical Care)
Surgery (General)
Gynecology & Obstetrics
Occupational Health and Environment Health
Forensic Medicine (Pathology and Clinical)
Anesthesiology and Pain Medicine

Province department level key discipline
Human body anatomy and organization embryology
Pharmacology
Medicine phantom study
Pathology and pathophysiology
Otolaryngology
Internal medicine, hematology
Immunology
Medical imaging and Nuclear Medicine
Clinical pharmacy
Forensic Pathology and Clinical Forensic Medicine

State key laboratory

Ministry of Education key laboratory

Key laboratory of Organ Transplanting, Prof. Chen Xiao-Ping
Key laboratory of Environment and Health, Prof. Zhou Yi-Kai

Ministry of health key laboratory
Key laboratory of Organ Transplanting, Prof. Chen Xiao-ping
Key laboratory of Respiratory System Disease, Prof. Xu Yong-Jian

Environmental protection bureau key laboratory
Key laboratory of Environmental Protection and Health, Prof. Zhou Yi-Kai

Hubei Province key laboratory
Key laboratory of Tumor Invasion and Metastasis, Prof. Ma Ding
Key laboratory of Nervous System Significant Disease, Prof. Wang Jian-Zhi
Key laboratory of Target to Biology Treatment, Prof. Huang Shi-Ang
Key laboratory of Food Nutrition and Safety, Prof. Liu Liegang

Presidents
1907~1909  Erich Paulun
1909~1917 Fu Shabo
? ~1940 Bai De
1941 Huang Rong-Zeng :zh:黄榕增
1941.5 ~1942.1 Liang Zhi-Yan :zh:梁之彦
1942.2 ~1942.9 Ding Wen-Yuan :zh:丁文渊
1942 ~1944 Ruang Shang-Cheng :zh:阮尚丞
1944 ~1945.8 Xu Yong-Ming :zh:徐诵明
1945 ~1951 Du Gong-Zhen :zh:杜公振
1951 ~1968 Tang Zhe :zh:唐哲
1968 ~1972 Yin Chuang-Zhao :zh:尹传昭
1972 ~1974 Xiong Yun-Fa :zh:熊运发
1974 ~1981 Zhang Di-Sheng :zh:张涤生
1981 ~1984 Qiu Fazu
1984 ~1992 Wu Zai-De :zh:吴在德
1992 ~1997 Xue De-Lin :zh:薛德麟
1997 ~2000 Hong Guang-Xiang :zh:洪光祥
2000 ~2005 Xiang Ji-Zhou :zh:向继洲
2005 ~2006 Tian Yu-Ke :zh:田玉科
2006 ~2012 Feng You-Mei :zh:冯友梅
2013 ~2015 Ma Jian-Hui :zh:马建辉
2015 ~present Chen Jian-Guo :zh:陈建国

Structure

Clinical institutes and centers
School of Basic Medicine
School of Public health
School of Pharmacy
School of Medicine & Health Management
Department of Forensic Medicine
School of Nursing
Family Planning Research Institute
First clinical college (Wuhan Union Hospital)
Second clinical college (Wuhan Tongji Hospital)
Third clinical college (Wuhan Liyuan Hospital)
Fourth clinical college (Wuhan No. 1 Hospital | Wuhan Hospital of Traditional Chinese and Western Medicine)
Fifth clinical college (Wuhan Central Hospital)
Sixth clinical college (Wuhan Children's Hospital)
Seventh clinical college (Hubei Cancer Hospital)
Eighth clinical college (Wuhan Pu'Ai Hospital | Wuhan No. 4 Hospital)
Ninth clinical college (Wuhan Mental Health Center)
Tenth clinical college (Hubei Maternity And Child Health Hospital) 
Eleventh clinical college (Wuhan Jinyintan Hospital)
Note: All of the above external links direct to Chinese websites.

Research institute, center and graduate school
Birth control research institute
Cardiovascular disease research institute
Cooperation of Chinese and Western medicine research institute
Environmental medicine research institute
Foundation medicine research institute
Gerontology research institute
Hematology research institute
Higher medicine education research institute
Immunology research institute
Liver disease research institute
Medicine humanities study research institute
Medicine informatics research institute
Neuroscience research institute
Occupational disease research institute
Organ transplantation research institute
Otolaryngology research institute
Pulmonary disease research institute
Social medicine research institute
Urology research institute

Affiliated hospitals

First clinical college (Wuhan Union Hospital)
Second clinical college (Wuhan Tongji Hospital)
Third clinical college (Wuhan Liyuan Hospital)
Fourth clinical college (Wuhan No. 1 Hospital | Wuhan Hospital of Traditional Chinese and Western Medicine)
Fifth clinical college (Wuhan Central Hospital)
Sixth clinical college (Wuhan Children's Hospital)
Seventh clinical college (Hubei Cancer Hospital)
Eighth clinical college (Wuhan Pu'Ai Hospital | Wuhan No. 4 Hospital)
Ninth clinical college (Wuhan Mental Health Center)
Tenth clinical college (Hubei Maternity And Child Health Hospital) 
Eleventh clinical college (Wuhan Jinyintan Hospital)
Note: All of the above external links direct to Chinese websites.

Student and teacher
Teachers approximately 2000 people, professors approximately 350 people, associate professors approximately 600 people. 
Current students approximately 10000 in the school.
Graduates approximately 60000.

School anniversary date
On May 20 (in 1924 changed the name for Tongji University medicine labor university when decided)

Old exhortation to students
Face upwards healthy tendency the place, law complete human ancient and modern

Notable alumni

Graduates
Liang Boqiang 梁伯强 1916 -1923 Medicine educationalist, and pathologist, member of Chinese Academy of Sciences, pioneer pathologist in China
Jin Wen-Qi 金问淇 1919 -1920 Pre-medical course, State level one professor, Gynecology and obstetrics expert
Bei Shi-Zhang 贝时璋 1919 -1921 Experimental biologist, cell biologist, educationalist. Member of Chinese Academy of Sciences,  founder of both Embryology and cytology in China, and founder of biophysics in China
Li Fu-Jing 李赋京 1920 State level one professor, the famous pathologist
Shen Qi-Zheng 沈其震 1923 entering medical school, medical physiologist, member of Chinese Academy of Sciences
Lu Fu-Hua 吕富华 1925 -1932 Pharmacologist, and medical educationalist
Tao Huan-Le 陶桓乐 1935 graduate,  State level one professor, pulmonologist
Xie Ming-Jin 谢敏晋 1932 -1936  microbiologist
Qiu Fa-Zu 裘法祖 1932 -1936 pre-medical course, member of Chinese Academy of Sciences
Wu Zhong-Bi 武忠弼 1936  Teaches at Tongji until now, pathologist
Qian Zhong-Xin 钱信忠 Former Chinese Minister of Health
Wu Meng-Chao 吴孟超 1949 graduate, member of Chinese Academy of Sciences
Wu Sheng 吴旻 1950 graduate,  member of Chinese Academy of Sciences
Lu Dao-Pei 陆道培 1955 graduate, member of Chinese Academy of Engineering
Hou Yun-De 侯云德 1955 graduate, member of Chinese Academy of Engineering
Gui Xi-En 桂希恩 1960 graduate, infectious disease expert, Belly-Martin medal winner
Zhou Hong-Hao 周宏灏 1962 graduate, member of Chinese Academy of Engineering
Yin Da-Kui 殷大奎 1964 graduate, former vice Chinese Minister of Health
He Jie-Sheng 何界生 1969 graduate, former vice Chinese Minister of Health, CEO of Chinese life insurance company
Tongzhang Zheng 郑同章 1980 Graduate, Professor at School of Public Health Brown University
Ke-qin Hu, 1982 graduate, Professor in Hematology, UC Ivrine
Jing Ma, 1983 graduate, Professor in Medicine, Harvard Medical School
Guohua Li, 1987 graduate, Professor in Epidemiology, Columbia University
Yang Bao-Feng 杨宝峰 1988 graduate, PhD of Pharmacology, member of Chinese Academy of Engineering, President of Harbin Medical University
Frank Hu 胡丙长 1988 graduate, Professor at Harvard T.H. Chan School of Public Health, Member of US National Academy of Medicine
Zhiyong Peng, 1989 graduate, Professor in Critical Care Medicine at University of Pittsburgh
Shen Kang 沈康 1994 graduate, HHMI Investigator, Professor at Stanford University
Guo-Li Ming 明国莉 1994 graduate, Perelman Professor of Neuroscience at University of Pennsylvania, member of US National Academy of Medicine

Faculty Members
Wang Bao-Wen 王宝韫 1939 -1958 Taught at Tongji, State level one professor
Tong Di-Zhou 童第周 1941 -1943 Taught at Tongji, experimental biologist, educationalist, and member of Chinese Academy of Sciences. Founder of China experimental Embryology. In 1963, he performed nuclear transfer (therapeutic cloning) by transferring DNA of Male Koi into eggs of koi, which resulted in replication of the male Koi with similar phenotype.
Li Bao-Shi 李宝实 1947 -1955 year Taught at Tongji, State level one professor, otolaryngologist.
Yu Guang-Yuan 于光元 1948- taught at Tongji, State level one professor
Zhang Di-Sheng 张涤生 1949 -1955 taught at Tongji, State level one professor, orthopedic surgery expert
Cai Dao-Hong 蔡宏道 1949- taught at Tongji, famous clinical pathologist,  environment hygienist, medical educationalist
Wang Zhi-Ping 王智平 Taught at Philosophy Department of Tongji Medical University. He initiated the medical student humanities education.

See also
Huazhong University of Science and Technology
Tongji University
Wuhan University

References

External links
Tongji Medical College, Wuhan
Tongji Medical College, Wuhan CHINESE
Tongji Medical College Overseas Alumni Association
Huazhong University of Science and Technology
Huazhong University of Science and Technology CHINESE
Tongji University medical School, Shanghai
Tongji University Medical School, Shanghai CHINESE
Tongji University, Shanghai
Tongji University, Shanghai CHINESE
Tongji University Medical School, Shanghai CHINESE
Tongji University discussion forum CHINESE
Wuhan University
Wuhan Uninversity CHINESE
Cultural discussion forum of Tongji Medical College students CHINESE
Tongji Med Chinese introduction CHINESE

Medical schools in China
Universities and colleges in Wuhan
Huazhong University of Science and Technology